Vicente Monje (born 22 June 1981) is a former Argentine footballer who last played for Central Norte. He previously played for Olympiacos, Ferro Carril Oeste and Orduspor.

Honours

Olympiacos
 Superleague Greece: 2011–12
 Greek Cup: 2012

References

1981 births
Living people
Argentine footballers
Argentine expatriate footballers
Club Atlético Atlanta footballers
Ferro Carril Oeste footballers
Gimnasia y Tiro footballers
Beerschot A.C. players
Olympiacos F.C. players
Olympiacos Volos F.C. players
Orduspor footballers
AEK Larnaca FC players
Belgian Pro League players
Super League Greece players
Süper Lig players
Cypriot First Division players
Expatriate footballers in Belgium
Expatriate footballers in Greece
Expatriate footballers in Turkey
Expatriate footballers in Cyprus
Sportspeople from Jujuy Province
Association football wingers